The 2014 Country Music Association Awards, and 48th Annual Ceremony, was held on November 5, 2014, from the Bridgestone Arena in Nashville, Tennessee. The show was hosted by Brad Paisley and Carrie Underwood for the seventh time. Miranda Lambert made CMA history when she won her eleventh award of the evening, making her the most awarded female artist in CMA history.

Nominees and winners
Winners are shown in bold.

Performers

Presenters

References 

Country Music Association
CMA
Country Music Association Awards
Country Music Association Awards
November 2014 events in the United States
2014 awards in the United States
21st century in Nashville, Tennessee
Events in Nashville, Tennessee